Charging Out Amazon is a 2002 Chinese action film directed by Song Yeming and written by Zhao Junfang and Wang Gehong, the film stars Hou Yong, Mu Lixin, and Tom Butler. The film was produced by August First Film Studio and CCTV-6. It was released in China on July 1, 2002. Charging Out Amazon received mixed to positive reviews and was a box office success. The film won Best Ornamental Effect Award from Beijing College Student Film Festival, four awards from Huabiao Awards, and three awards from Golden Rooster Awards and was nominated for Best Recording.

Cast
 Hou Yong as Wang Hui, lieutenant of the special troop of People's Liberation Army.
 Mu Lixin as Hu Xiaolong, second lieutenant of the special troop of People's Liberation Army.
 Tom Butler as Cody Ross, general.
 Croft Wiutam as Chief instructor.
 Heath Cortn as Lina Ross, doctoress, Cody Ross's daughter.
 Dean Marshall as Johnson, lieutenant of the storm troops.
 Andr Thompsom as Rossini, lieutenant of the amphibious assault team.
 J. R. Bourne as Michael, lieutenant of the storm troops.
 Ton Cutnbert as "Black lion", the drug gang leader.

Production
This film was shot in Sanya, Hainan.

Accolades

References

External links
 
 

Films shot in Hainan
Films set in Brazil
Chinese action films
2000s Chinese films